Catherine Blake (née Boucher; 25 April 1762 – 18 October 1831) was the wife of the poet, painter and engraver William Blake, and a vital presence and assistant throughout his life.

Life
Catherine was the last child of market gardener William Boucher (1714–1794) and Mary Davis (1716–1782). A "demure young woman", in response to her mother's queries regarding which of her acquaintances she would take for a husband, she would reply that she had not yet met such a man. She met William Blake in Battersea in 1781, during his brief visit to the area, while he was recovering from an emotional upset following the failure of an earlier relationship. Their courtship was brief. According to early biographers of Blake, Catherine immediately recognised him as her future husband and when she sympathised with him over his earlier emotional troubles he replied "do you pity me? Then I love you." 
Blake married Catherine – who was five years his junior – on 18 August 1782 in St. Mary's Church, Battersea. Illiterate, Catherine signed her wedding contract with an 'X' "like many brides of her day", there being "no national schools... and even regular Sunday schools had not been invented". They remained together until his death in 1827. Blake taught her to read and write, and also to use his printing-press. She was considered to be the foundation of Blake's "invariable type of woman" as depicted in his art, "tall, slender, and with unusually long legs".

The couple did not have children, and it has been suggested that Blake wanted to bring a concubine into the relationship to act as a surrogate mother, which was consistent with the theories of Swedenborgianism by which Blake was influenced. Blake's earliest biographer Alexander Gilchrist does not mention this, but speaks of unspecified troubles in the early years of the relationship. However, Algernon Charles Swinburne later explicitly asserted that this was the case, but that Blake dropped the idea when he saw that it upset Catherine. No documentary evidence survives supporting this notion, but Blake is known to have stated that he "learned from the Bible that wives should be held in common."

Writers who knew the couple in their later years describe a very happy relationship. In 1802, William Hayley wrote that William "and his excellent wife (a true helpmate!) pass the plates thro' a rolling press in their own cottage together". On his deathbed, Blake drew a picture of Catherine as his last work, stating "you have ever been an angel to me".

After her husband's death Catherine was taken in by Blake's admirer Frederick Tatham, for whom she nominally worked as a housekeeper. At this period she continued to sell Blake's works. When she died four years later Tatham claimed that she had bequeathed all Blake's works to him. When he later converted to Irvingite beliefs, he destroyed a number of them, asserting that they were inspired by the devil.

Catherine and William are buried at Bunhill Cemetery in London.

Role in Blake's art
Throughout her husband's uneven career, Catherine not only took an active role in the production of William's engravings and illuminated books; she also ran the household finances and offered strong practical support. William's friend J. T. Smith said that Blake "allowed her, to the last moment of his practice, to take off his proof impressions and print his works, which she did most carefully." Catherine's role in colouring at least some of William's illuminated books has been wide, although her hand is usually attributed to some of the more clumsily rendered passages. Her work as a printer is held in higher regard.

Role in literature
It has often been suggested that the figure of Enitharmon in Blake's mythology is partly inspired by Catherine. Enitharmon is the wife of the "eternal prophet" Los in Blake's writings. Catherine is explicitly identified as the poet's "shadow of delight" in the second part of Blake's Milton.

Catherine appears as a model wife in William Hayley's writings on ideal marriages. In more recent literature, she is the central character in Janet Adele Warner's novel Other Sorrows, Other Joys: The Marriage of Catherine Sophia Boucher and William Blake (2001) and also features in Tracy Chevalier's novel Burning Bright (2007). She is an amateur detective in short stories by Keith Heller.

Jack Shepherd's stage play In Lambeth dramatised a visit by Thomas Paine to the Lambeth home of William and Catherine Blake in 1789. It was first performed at the East Dulwich Tavern in July 1989. The play was later adapted for television in the BBC Two Encounters series (which featured similar fictionalised meetings between historical figures) and was first broadcast on 4 July 1993. It was directed by Sebastian Graham-Jones, and featured Mark Rylance as William, Bob Peck as Paine and Lesley Clare O'Neill as Catherine.

Notes

References
 Myrone, Martin. The Blake Book. London: Tate, 2007. 
 

1762 births
1831 deaths
English printers